The 1946 Pittsburgh Panthers football team was an American football team that represented the University of Pittsburgh as an independent during the 1946 college football season. In their first and only year under head coach Wes Fesler, the Panthers compiled a 3–5–1 record and were outscored by 136 to 88. Three of their losses were to teams ranked in the final AP Poll: No. 1 Notre Dame (0–33); No. 5 Illinois (7–33); and No. 20 Indiana (6–20).

Schedule

References

Pittsburgh
Pittsburgh Panthers football seasons
Pittsburgh Panthers football